Premier Lotto Limited popularly called Baba Ijebu is a gaming company that offers lotto services and betting in Nigeria. It is the oldest known Nigerian lotto game operator and was registered in 2001.

Baba Ijebu offers over 20 different lotto games which include Diamond, Peoples, Bingo, MSP, Metro, International, Gold, 06, Jackpot, Lucky G, Clubmaster, Super, Tota, Mark 2, Vag, Enugu, Midweek, Fairchance, Fortune, Royal, Bonanza, King, National, Lucky.

Baba Ijebu was founded by gaming magnate Sir Kesington Adebukunola Adebutu CON, KJW, FISM who is also its current CEO.

Sponsorship
In 2017 also, Baba Ijebu refused to sign Quadri Aruna on a three-year endorsement deal worth $75,000

References

External links

Lotteries by country
Online gambling companies of Nigeria
Companies based in Lagos